Hannes Staudinger (5 March 1907 – 1 August 1974) was an Austrian cinematographer.

Selected filmography
 Women Are No Angels (1943)
 Viennese Girls (1945)
 Fregola (1948)
 On Resonant Shores (1948)
 Eroica (1949)
 Bonus on Death (1950)
 Vienna Waltzes (1951)
 Dunja (1955)
 Kaiserjäger (1956)
 The Daring Swimmer (1957)
 The Priest and the Girl (1958)
 Twelve Girls and One Man (1959)
 The Merry Wives of Windsor (1965)
 Age of Consent (1969)
 Superbug, Super Agent (1972)

References

Bibliography 
 Fritsche, Maria. Homemade Men In Postwar Austrian Cinema: Nationhood, Genre and Masculinity . Berghahn Books, 2013.

External links 
 

1907 births
1974 deaths
Austrian cinematographers
People from Tyrol (state)